Bastian Steger (born 19 March 1981) is a German table tennis player. He competed for Germany at the 2012 Summer Olympics where he won a bronze medal in the team event. He also won the bronze medal in the men's team event during the 2016 Summer Olympics in Rio de Janeiro.

References

External links
 
 
 
 
 
 

1981 births
Living people
German male table tennis players
Olympic table tennis players of Germany
Olympic bronze medalists for Germany
Olympic medalists in table tennis
Table tennis players at the 2012 Summer Olympics
Table tennis players at the 2016 Summer Olympics
Medalists at the 2012 Summer Olympics
Medalists at the 2016 Summer Olympics